The U.S. state of Louisiana currently has six congressional districts.  The state has had as many as eight districts; the eighth district was eliminated on January 9, 1993 after results of the 1990 census, and the seventh district was eliminated in 2013 post Hurricane Katrina population stagnation after the results of the 2010 census.

History
See District of Louisiana, Louisiana Territory, Territory of Orleans.

Louisiana was purchased from France in 1803, and the territory was organized into the District of Louisiana and the Territory of Orleans in 1804.  Areas that are within the current boundaries of Louisiana, but were outside the Territory of Orleans, were ceded by the Spanish in the Adams-Onís Treaty of 1819.  From 1806 until 1811, the Territory of Orleans sent one non-voting delegate to the U.S. House of Representatives.  Upon Louisiana's admission to the United States in 1812, and until 1823, Louisiana had only one at-large representative.  In 1823, three districts were granted to Louisiana.  By 1875, Louisiana had six districts.

Current districts and representatives
List of members of the United States House delegation from Louisiana, their terms, their district boundaries, and the district political ratings according to the CPVI. The delegation currently has a total of 6 members. 5 of the current representatives are Republicans and the other is a Democrat.

Historical and present district boundaries
Table of United States congressional district boundary maps in the State of Louisiana, presented chronologically. All redistricting events that took place in Louisiana between 1973 and 2013 are shown.

Obsolete districts
 , obsolete since statehood
  (1812–1823; 1873–1875)
 , obsolete since the 2010 census
 , obsolete since the 1990 census

See also
 List of United States congressional districts

References

 
Congressional districts